Elizabeth Allan (9 April 1910 – 27 July 1990) was an English stage and film actress who worked in both Britain and Hollywood, where she appeared in 50 films.

Life and career
Allan was born in Skegness, Lincolnshire in 1910 and educated in Darlington, County Durham. At age 17, she made her stage debut at the Old Vic. She made her film debut four years later in Alibi.

She appeared in a number of films for Julius Hagen's Twickenham Studios, but was also featured in Gainsborough's Michael and Mary and Korda's Service for Ladies. In 1932 she married agent Wilfrid J. O'Bryen, to whom she was introduced by actor Herbert Marshall; they were together until his death in 1977.

Her first US/UK co-production and first US production came in 1933, and she worked in the United States under contract with Metro-Goldwyn-Mayer. 1935 was her most memorable year in Hollywood, when she not only distinguished herself in two memorable Dickens' adaptations as David's unfortunate young mother in George Cukor's David Copperfield and as Lucie Manette in Jack Conway's A Tale of Two Cities, but was also featured in Tod Browning's Mark of the Vampire.

Allan did not think highly of the latter film, to which she had been assigned, and considered it "slumming".  MGM announced her for a leading part in King Vidor's The Citadel, but she was subsequently replaced by Rosalind Russell. When she was replaced again by Greer Garson in Goodbye, Mr Chips, Elizabeth successfully sued the studio. The studio retaliated by refusing to let her work, and, frustrated, she returned to the UK in 1938. The same year she appeared onstage in the West End farce The Innocent Party alongside Basil Radford and Cecil Parker.

By the 1950s, Allan had made the transition to character parts. Particularly memorable is her appearance as Trevor Howard's brittle and dissatisfied wife in the film adaptation of Graham Greene's The Heart of the Matter (1953). In 1958, she appeared as Boris Karloff's wife in The Haunted Strangler. Late in her career, she was a frequent panellist on television game shows, including the British version of What's My Line?. She was named Great Britain's Top Female TV Personality of 1952.

Death
She died at Hove, on the Sussex coast, at age 80. She was cremated at Woodvale Crematorium in Brighton and the ashes were taken by the family.

Legacy
Her name is on Brighton & Hove's Scania OmniDekka bus 655.

Filmography

Film

Television

References

External links

Photographs and literature on Elizabeth Allan

1910 births
1990 deaths
English film actresses
English stage actresses
English television personalities
People from Skegness
People from Hove
Metro-Goldwyn-Mayer contract players
Actresses from Sussex
20th-century English actresses
British expatriate actresses in the United States